Aamu (Egyptian language: 𓂝𓄿𓅓𓅱 ) was an Egyptian name used to designate Western Asiatic foreigners in antiquity. It is generally translated as "Western Asiatic", but suggestions have been made these could be identical with the Canaanites or the Amorites.

Abraham could have been related to the Western Asian people known to have visited Egypt during the second millennium BCE, such as the Aamu or Retjenu. David Rohl proposed to identify Abraham with the Aamu, well known in Egyptian sources as a people of West Asia. In Egyptian, the reading of the second aleph, when there are two consecutive alephs in a word, change to "r" or "l", so that the word Aamu, which has traditionally been suspected to mean Amorites, may actually be read "Aramu", referring to the Arameans, and associated with Abraham through the name given to his people, although one source states "Abraham the wandering Aramaean", this is based on glossing the actual expression, "a wandering Aramean was my father".

Although they have left no inscriptions in their own language, some of their personal names have turned up in Egyptian records, which are a syntactical and lexical match for West Semitic dialects. An ancient Egyptian painting in the tomb of 12th Dynasty official Khnumhotep II, at Beni Hasan (c. 1900 BCE), shows a group of West Asiatic foreigners, possibly Canaanites, labelled as Aamu, including the leading man with a Nubian ibex labelled "Abisha the Hyksos" (𓋾𓈎𓈉 ḥḳꜣ-ḫꜣsw, Heqa-kasut for "Hyksos"). The Aamu from this relief are further labeled as being from the area of Shu, which may be identified, with some uncertainty, with the area of Moab in southern Palestine (region), around the Jordan river, or generally the southern Levant, just east of the Jordan river and the Red Sea.

References

Geography of ancient Egypt
Canaan